Jayne Kennedy Overton (née Harrison; born October 27, 1951) is an American television personality, actress, model, corporate spokeswoman, producer, writer, public speaker, philanthropist, and sports broadcaster.

Personal life
Jayne Kennedy was born Jayne Harrison in Wickliffe, Ohio, one of six children.  Her parents Herbert and Virginia Harrison taught their children to "aim high, give God most of the credit, suffer disappointments silently, and avoid maliciousness." In high school, she was on the cheerleading squad, was a member of the National Honor Society, and was elected three times the president of her high school class.

A year after graduating high school, Harrison met Leon Isaac Kennedy, a DJ and a struggling writer/actor. They married in 1971. Motown singer/songwriter Smokey Robinson served as best man at their wedding. They divorced in 1982.

In May 1985, Kennedy married actor Bill Overton in Bermuda.  The wedding was small, and the parents of both Kennedy and Overton attended. The couple have four children: Overton's daughter Cheyenne (b. 1982) and their three daughters Savannah Re (b. November 20, 1985), Kopper Joi (b. May 17, 1989) and Zaire Ollyea (b. September 15, 1995).  Kennedy and Overton celebrated their 35th wedding anniversary in May, 2020.

Career

Kennedy was crowned Miss Ohio in 1970, going on to compete in the top ten in the Miss USA Pageant.

In 1971, Kennedy first appeared as a dancer in "Rowan and Martin's Laugh-In," and performed with Bob Hope's Bases Around the World Christmas Tour (Vietnam, Japan, Thailand, Spain, and Cuba), which led to three years with "The Dean Martin Show" as a singer/dancer.

Throughout the 1970's, Kennedy played guest roles in such television shows as "The Six Million Dollar Man," "Sanford and Son," and "Starsky & Hutch." She found work in many commercials of the era for such companies as Foster Grant, Chrysler Corporation, and McDonald's.  She also played a lead role in the 1977 film Big Time, which featured a soundtrack by the film's producer Smokey Robinson.

In 1978, Kennedy replaced anchor Phyllis George on The NFL Today on CBS.  After a contractual dispute with the network, she went on to host the short-lived "Speak Up, America" in 1980.

Kennedy won the 1982 NAACP Image Award for Outstanding Actress in a Motion Picture for her performance as Julie Winters in the 1981 film Body and Soul co-starring then–husband Leon Isaac Kennedy.

Kennedy won an Emmy Award for her work hosting the 1982 Rose Bowl.

In 1982 she began hosting the syndicated television show "Greatest Sports Legends," in which she interviewed such luminaries as Kareem Abdul-Jabbar and Johnny Unitas.

During the mid-1980’s Kennedy appeared in TV commercials for the Coca-Cola Corporation’s Tab soft drink, and for Jovan Musk perfume. Kennedy joined the exercise-video craze of the mid-1980's with the release of her own video "Love Your Body," which was distributed by RCA/Columbia Home Video.  She advised in the video to "[e]stablish a positive belief in yourself. Learn what your body needs and love it for what it is.” 

In 1990, Kennedy and Bill Overton produced “The Journey of the African American,” with performances in Atlanta and a 30-week run in Los Angeles.

Kennedy has added her support to many charitable causes over the years through appearances and speaking engagements.  She co-hosted "The Lou Rawls Parade of Stars" in 1986, which raised $10 million dollars for The United Negro College Fund.  Kennedy was a keynote speaker at the Evanston Martin Luther King celebration in 1987.  In 1988, she became the national spokesperson for The National Council of Negro Women, which presented annual, nationwide Black Family Reunion Celebration clinics and seminars. She was a speaker at the 12th Annual Freedom Fund Dinner in Columbia, South Carolina in 1990.

Selected filmography
Film
 1973: Group Marriage as Judy
 1975: Let's Do It Again as Girl at Factory
 1976: The Muthers as Serena
 1977: Big Time as Shana Baynes
 1978: Death Force (aka Fighting Mad) as Maria Russell
 1981: Body and Soul as Julie Winters (NAACP Image Award: Best Actress)

Television
 1973: Ironside as Maylene (Season 7, episode 12: "The Last Payment") 
 1974: Banacek as Girl Demonstrator (Season 2, episode 6: "Rocket to Oblivion") 
 1974: Sanford and Son as Brenda (Season 4, episode 5: "There'll Be Some Changes Made") 
 1975: The Six Million Dollar Man as Louise (Season 3, episode 4: "The Song and Dance Spy") 
 1976: The Rockford Files as Janice (Season 2, episode 21: "Foul on the First Play")
 1977: The New Adventures of Wonder Woman as Carolyn Hamilton (Season 2, episode 5: "Knockout")
 1977: Police Woman as Cora (Season 4, episode 4: "The Inside Connection")
 1978-1980: The NFL Today – Reporter (NFL pre-game show)
 1979: Mysterious Island of Beautiful Women as Chocolate (TV movie)
 1980: CHiPs as Pat Blake (Season 3, episode 18: "Kidnap") 
 1980: Circus of the Stars #5 (TV special)
 1981: CHiPs as Paula Woods (Season 5, episode 12: "Mitchell and Woods") 
 1981: The Love Boat as Kelsey (Season 4, episodes 25 & 26: "This Year's Model/The Model Marriage/Vogue Rogue/Too Clothes for Comfort/Original Sin", Parts 1 & 2)
 1983: The Love Boat as Kate Langley (Season 6, episode 20: "The Zinging Valentine/The Very Temporary Secretary/Final Score")
 1983: Diff'rent Strokes as Mrs. Jenkins (Season 6, episode 7: "The Moonlighter") 
 1984: Benson as Elizabeth Burnett (Season 6, episode 3: "Let's Get Physical") 
 1986: Benson as Elizabeth Burnett (Season 7, episode 20: "Three on a Mismatch")
 1986: 227 as Betty Mumphrey (Season 2, episode 3: "Washington Affair")

References

External links
 
 
 The Legend of Jayne Kennedy ... Nuff
 Jayne Kennedy Overton Website - A Mother Daughter Thing 

Living people
African-American female models
20th-century American actresses
Actresses from Washington, D.C.
African-American actresses
American beauty pageant winners
American sports announcers
Miss USA 1970s delegates
National Football League announcers
People from Lake County, Ohio
Women sports announcers
1951 births
20th-century African-American women
20th-century African-American people
21st-century African-American women
21st-century African-American people